Carole Switala (September 23, 1946  – July 9, 2016) was an American puppeteer, singer and voice actress. She was best known as the puppeteer and voice of  Ana Platypus and Prince Tuesday, inhabitants of the fictional Neighborhood of Make-Believe on the children's television series, Mister Rogers' Neighborhood.

Switala, a resident of the North Side region of Pittsburgh, Pennsylvania, died on July 9, 2016, at the age of 69.

References

External links

1946 births
2016 deaths
American puppeteers
American voice actresses
Actresses from Pittsburgh
21st-century American women